Chiara Noja (born 16 March 2006) is a German professional golfer who plays on the Ladies European Tour. She turned professional in October 2021 at age 15. On 5 June 2022, Noja became the youngest-ever European to win an official Women's World Golf Rankings event by winning the Amundi Czech Ladies Challenge by 9 strokes. At the end of 2022, aged 16 and 241 days, she won her first Ladies European Tour (LET) title by winning the Aramco Team Series – Jeddah.

Early life and amateur career
Noja was born in Berlin, Germany, and emigrated to England at the age of seven and quickly showed her talent for the game, becoming a scratch golfer by 12, and at 13 she topped the European rankings in the under-14 age group. Following her tied-ninth finish at the 2020 Women's Amateur Championship, she made her Ladies European Tour (LET) debut as a 14-year-old at the 2020 Omega Dubai Moonlight Classic.

In 2021, due to COVID-19 pandemic travel restrictions, Noja started playing on the LET Access Series to replace the amateur events she couldn't travel to. She finished 8th at the 2021 PGA Championship and led the Golf Flanders LETAS Trophy in Antwerp, Belgium ahead of the final round, but shot a 73 and finished runner-up behind Lily May Humphreys.

Professional career
Noja turned professional in October 2021 (with a handicap of +7.4), at 15 years old after she received sponsor invitations to the Dubai Moonlight Classic, Aramco Saudi Ladies International, and the Aramco Team Series – Jeddah, missing none of the cuts. She was ineligible to attend LET Qualifying School in December 2021, as she did not meet the tour's minimum age requirement of 16. However, she received sponsor invitations to the Aramco Saudi Ladies International and all five Aramco Team Series events of 2022.

2022 First wins
Noja began her 2022 season at the Aramco Saudi Ladies International, where she finished 13th, followed by a second place at the Terre Blanche Ladies Open. She recorded her maiden professional win at the Amundi Czech Ladies Challenge in June 2022, after shooting rounds of 65-68-71 for a 9 stroke victory, and rose to the top of the LET Access Series Order of Merit. After 1 win, 2 seconds, 3 thirds and 4 fourth to tenth places, missing none of the cuts in 13 LET Access Series events on 16 September, Noja secured her LET Tour card for the 2023 season by finishing second on the Order of Merit. Noja won her first Ladies European Tour (LET) title on 12 November 2022 by winning the Aramco Team Series (individual event) at Jeddah, Saudi Arabia. She defeated Charley Hull on the second hole of a sudden-death playoff after both players finished regulation play at −13. She finished the season ninth for lowest stroke average and first for the average driving distance in the LET Rankings.

2023 Continued success
Noja began her 2023 season in February at the Lalla Meryem Cup where she finished 11th, followed by a 12th place at the Aramco Saudi Ladies International where she won her biggest-ever career prize money of $102,500 with rounds of 71-70-65-70 (−12), including three eagles. On 8 March, Noja broke the course record at the LET South African Women's Open at Steenberg Golf Club in Cape Town. Her round of 62, ten under par, was the lowest in her professional career. She finished the tournament in third place with rounds of 62-71-69-69 (−17). As a result, she broke for the first time into the top 100 in the Rolex Women's World Golf Rankings, ranked 95.

Professional wins (2)

Ladies European Tour wins (1)

Ladies European Tour playoff record (1–0)

LET Access Series wins (1)

World ranking
Position in Women's World Golf Rankings at the end of each calendar year.

^ As of 20 March 2023

References

External links

German female golfers
2006 births
Living people
21st-century German women